Popples is a toy and television franchise created by Those Characters From Cleveland (TCFC), a subsidiary of American Greetings. Popples resemble brightly colored marsupial teddy bears with long tails ending in a pom-pom. Each Popple character transforms to resemble a brightly colored ball. In 2018, Popples was sold to Hasbro.

History
Susan Trentel, who worked for TCFC and had created the first prototypes on Strawberry Shortcake and Care Bears, was the plush toy designer who invented the method for transforming the Popple. Supposedly, the idea came from rolling up socks. Trentel worked with art director Thomas Schneider on the creation of the first prototypes (Patent #4614505).

Toy merchandise
Popples were manufactured by Mattel between 1986 and 1988. Each toy had a pouch on the back that could be inverted so the character rolled into the pouch and resembled a brightly colored ball.

Original line (1986)
The first introduction included nine Popples in three different sizes

 Pretty Cool (P.C. for short) is a 13" male Popple with blue fur, pink hair, orange cheeks and contrasting orange and yellow ears.
 Party is a 13" female Popple, with pink fur, hot pink hair, lavender cheeks and contrasting lavender and pink ears.
 Pancake is a 13" female Popple with purple fur, orange hair, pink cheeks and contrasting blue and pink ears.
 Puzzle is an 11" male Popple with orange fur, green hair, pink cheeks and contrasting blue and red ears. 
 Prize is an 11" female Popple with dark magenta fur, white hair, lavender cheeks and contrasting green and pink ears.
 Puffball is an 11" female Popple with white fur, yellow hair, orange cheeks and contrasting blue and magenta ears.
 Pretty Bit is a 8" female Popple with lavender fur, hot pink hair, pink cheeks and contrasting pink and blue ears.
 Potato Chip is a 8" female Popple with yellow fur, pink hair, pink cheeks and contrasting lavender and magenta ears. 
 Putter is a 8" male Popple with green fur, orange hair, pink cheeks and contrasting red and blue ears.

Rock Star Popples and Baby Popples
The second launch brought the Rock Star Popples: Punkity (magenta girl with microphone and star on her belly) and Punkster (blue boy with guitar and lightning on his belly) as well as the Popples Babies: Bibsy (white with purple and white hat, bib and booties with stars) and Cribsy (pink with blue and white striped hat, bib and booties). The babies had rattles in their tails and came with a squeaking baby bottle.

Pufflings
A line extension brought about Pufflings, which looked like little Popple pets (they were basically a ball of fluff with a face and tiny paws and tail coming out, and could flip inside out to look a bit like a sea anemone) and carried riddles and jokes on tags inside them. There were 6 different colors of Pufflings: Red, yellow, sky blue, purple, white and magenta.

Sports Popples
The Popples also had Sports Popples who turned into balls: Big Kick (soccer ball), Dunker (basketball), Touchdown (football), PC Pitcher (baseball), Net Set (tennis ball). The Sports Popples included Cuester, who turned into an 8-ball, but no known toy has been made of him. Similarly, no toy was made of the original Pitcher but PC was dressed in a baseball outfit to replace him.

Other full-sized Popples
There were numerous variants: Flower Popples (who would turn into flowers when you flipped them inside out), Pillow Popples (wearing pajamas and turned into sleeping bags), Fruit Popples (who turned into different fruits), and Special Editions with limited distribution (including an animal series only released in Europe with Popples that resembled a parrot, dog and rabbit), and Costume Popples who were wearing special outfits and turned into something related (example: a ballerina Popple that turns into a handbag).

Pocket Popples
Besides the stuffed animals, another successful Popple-themed line of merchandise was Pocket Popples. Based on same characters as the larger Popples they were scaled to fit in a pocket. They had PVC faces, articulated arms and legs, and fabric features of ears, tails and pocket (where they hid).

2001 revival lines
In 2001, Toymax started making the Popples once again, but they made the new Glow 'n' Charm Popples (Pitter Patty, Pizazzy Jazzy and Popsy Daisy). This rendition features four characters named Pixie Doodle, Polka Dottie and Pinwheel Penny (who looks like Putter from the toyline, but with blue stripes). There is also a Snoozytime Popple who looks like P.C. Popple, but wears pyjamas and a nightcap, plus celebrity Popples which includes the Popples who had their name based on celebrities including Tiffany, Rachael Leigh Cook, Elisa Donovan, Nicole Oliver, Melissa Joan Hart, Amanda Lewis, Shoshanna Lonstein, Jessica Biel and Christina Ricci. They also introduced the items starring the classic 80's Popples, including stickers, notebook, folder, pen, keyring and tin box keyring. They introduced birthday cards as well.

2007 revival lines
A revival was attempted by Playmates Toys (who is also the current manufacturer of toys featuring another American Greetings property, Strawberry Shortcake) in 2007. This rendition only has four characters, KissyPopp (pink), HappyPopp (yellow), MonsterPopp (blue), and PrettyPopp (purple), marketed under the name 'Popp n Giggles Popples' which contain a sound box that makes a popping sound followed by a giggle when the Popple comes out of its pouch (or when you press down on the shoulders while in its box, or sitting on a hard surface). Also released in 2007 was a version of Popples 'Pufflings' called 'Popp n Mini Message Popples', SpeedyPopp (red), FriendlyPopp (purple), RiddlePopp (blue) and SecretPopp (pink) which could record a 'message'. There are also "Key Chain" and "Cell Phone Charm" mini plush Popples that more closely resemble the Popples of the available in countries outside the US, such as Japan. Key Chain Popples that have been spotted include those that resemble Party, Puffball and Potato Chip. Various "Deco Packing Tape", and T-shirts, stationery and school supplies featuring the original Popples exist as well.

2015 revival
Coinciding with the new Popples series on Netflix, a revived toy line was released in November 2015 by Spin Master and Saban Brands, including the characters Bubbles, Lulu, Sunny, Izzy, and Yikes.

2020 revival lines
Hasbro launched a Funko POP Vinyl toyline of the original 86's Popples, starting with Prize and P.C. and continuing on with other Popples in the future.

Television media

Original series

The original Popples animated series was broadcast in United States, and later rebroadcast in the United Kingdom.

Netflix series: 2015

The franchise was adapted for a Netflix original series that premiered in October 2015.

Other media
Star Comics released a four-issue series between 1992 and 1997, coinciding with the original cartoon.

See also
 Care Bears
 My Little Pony
 The Wuzzles
 Trolls

References

External links

 

Mass media franchises introduced in the 1990s
1990s toys
American Greetings
Fictional humanoids
Transforming toys
Stuffed toys